Phycodes penitis is a moth in the family Brachodidae. It was described by Alexey Diakonoff in 1978. It is found in northern Borneo.

References

Natural History Museum Lepidoptera generic names catalog

Brachodidae
Moths described in 1978